Statistics of the Scottish Football League in season 1897–98.

Overview
Celtic are champions of the Scottish Division One.

Kilmarnock won the Scottish Division Two but were not promoted.

Scottish League Division One

Scottish League Division Two

See also
1897–98 in Scottish football

References

1897-98